USS Gravely (DDG-107) is an  guided missile destroyer in the United States Navy. She is named after Vice Admiral Samuel L. Gravely, Jr. Commissioned in 2010, she has been on several overseas deployments.

Construction 
Gravely is the 57th destroyer in her class. She was authorized on 13 September 2002 and her keel was laid down on 26 November 2007 at Northrop Grumman Shipbuilding's Ingalls Shipbuilding shipyard in Pascagoula, Mississippi. Gravely was launched on 30 March 2009. The ship is named after Vice Admiral Samuel L. Gravely, Jr. Admiral Gravely's wife, Alma Gravely, christened the ship on 16 May 2009 and serves as ship's sponsor. Retired Navy Admiral J. Paul Reason was the principal speaker at the ceremony, which was held at Northrop's facility in Pascagoula. She successfully completed sea trials in June 2010. Gravely, Northrop Grumman's 27th Aegis'equipped guided missile destroyer, was commissioned at Wilmington, North Carolina on 20 November 2010.

Service history

On 18 November 2013, Gravely returned to Naval Station Norfolk, Virginia, completing her first overseas deployment.

Once the weapons were offloaded, the dhow and its crew were released. In June 2016 while escorting the aircraft carrier  the destroyer had a close encounter with a Russian Navy frigate causing Russian and US Navy officials to accuse each other of dangerous and unprofessional conduct. On 11 March 2019, as part of Carrier Strike Group Eight (CSG-8), Gravely received the Meritorious Unit Commendation award in support of Operation Inherent Resolve during the 2015-2016 deployment.

On 13 May 2022, Gravely took part in a PASSEX training with the Finnish and Swedish navies in the northern Baltic Sea.

On 24 June 2022, Gravely returned to Norfolk.

References

External links

 Official website of PCU Gravely Retrieved 2016-07-01.

Commissioning website 

 

Arleigh Burke-class destroyers
Ships built in Pascagoula, Mississippi
2009 ships
Carrier Strike Group Two